Apotheta is a monotypic moth genus in the family Geometridae. Its single species, Apotheta tanymita, is found in Australia. Both the genus and species were first described by Turner in 1931.

References

Oenochrominae
Geometridae genera
Monotypic moth genera